The Nombinnie Nature Reserve is a protected nature reserve in central New South Wales.

References

Nature reserves in New South Wales
Protected areas established in 1988